Antonio Nitto (born 2 December 1938) is an Italian speed skater. He competed in three events at the 1960 Winter Olympics.

References

1938 births
Living people
Italian male speed skaters
Olympic speed skaters of Italy
Speed skaters at the 1960 Winter Olympics
Sportspeople from Rome